The Walther TP and TPH handguns are extremely compact double-action lightweight semi-automatic pistols in .22 Long Rifle and .25 ACP calibers. Pistols in this size range are sometimes referred to as pocket pistols, or Taschen Pistolen in German (TPH stands for the Taschen Pistole, Hahn, or "pocket pistol, hammer" variant). The TP was produced by Walther from 1961-1971 and the improved TPH has been produced continuously since 1968.  Models have been produced in Germany and (by Interarms) in the US.

Description
The TPH is blow-back operated and does not have a breech locking system. The barrel is fixed to the frame and fits tightly in the slide so that no bushing is needed. The recoil spring is assembled around the barrel and is retained and compressed by the slide such that no bushing is necessary. Unlike the Walther TP, with its open-top slide, the TPH has an enclosed breech with an ejection window. The extractor is an L- shaped piece of steel which is spring supported and positioned in a groove on the right side of the frame beside the striker. Similar to the TP, the ejector is positioned on the left side of the breech block behind the magazine well and the connector runs externally on the right side of the frame, beneath the right grip plate. The one-piece firing pin and the striker spring protrude through the safety arbor and are held in position by it. There is a break-trough on the left side of the slide where the safety lever, which is fixed to the arbor, is positioned. It has a 60-degree turn similar to the late PPK models, with down as the safe position and up as the firing position simultaneously showing a red mark.

Specifications

Gallery

See also
Walther Arms
Walther PPK

External links
Walther USA page on TPH
NRA "Dope Bag" Article

Walther semi-automatic pistols
.22 LR pistols
.25 ACP semi-automatic pistols